Spasoje Bulajič (born 24 November 1975 in Slovenj Gradec) is a Slovenian footballer who has represented his country at the Euro 2000 and the Football World Cup 2002.

Club career
Born in Slovenj Gradec, Bulajič started his football career at his home club Rudar Velenje. In the 1994–95 season he had short spell at Olimpija Ljubljana. After two seasons in Celje, he moved to Maribor. He was named 1997 Slovenian Youth Footballer of the Year and 1998 Slovenian Footballer of the Year, as Maribor won two consecutive Slovenian Championships and one Slovenian Cup. Later he played for German Köln and Mainz 05, Slovenian Mura Murska Sobota and Cypriot AEL Limassol and AEP Paphos FC. In the 2008–09 season, he again played for Celje.

International career
Bulajič was capped 26 times and scored one goal for Slovenia. He was a participant at the Euro 2000 and World Cup 2002.

International goals
Scores and results list Slovenia's goal tally first.

Honours
Maribor
Slovenian PrvaLiga: 1996–97, 1997–98
Slovenian Cup: 1996–97

AEP Paphos
Cypriot Second Division: 2007–08

See also
Slovenian international players
List of NK Maribor players

References

External links
Player profile at PrvaLiga 
Player profile at NZS 

1975 births
Living people
Sportspeople from Slovenj Gradec
Slovenian footballers
Association football defenders
Slovenian expatriate footballers
Slovenian PrvaLiga players
NK Rudar Velenje players
NK Olimpija Ljubljana (1945–2005) players
NK Celje players
NK Maribor players
1. FC Köln players
1. FSV Mainz 05 players
NK Mura players
AEL Limassol players
AEP Paphos FC players
Cypriot First Division players
Cypriot Second Division players
Bundesliga players
2. Bundesliga players
Expatriate footballers in Cyprus
Expatriate footballers in Germany
Slovenian expatriate sportspeople in Cyprus
Slovenian expatriate sportspeople in Germany
UEFA Euro 2000 players
2002 FIFA World Cup players
Slovenia international footballers